In chemistry, a molecule or ion is called chiral if it cannot be superposed on its mirror image by any combination of rotations, translations, and some conformational changes. This geometric property is called chirality. The terms are derived from Ancient Greek χείρ (cheir) 'hand'; which is the canonical example of an object with this property.

A chiral molecule or ion exists in two stereoisomers that are mirror images of each other, called enantiomers; they are often distinguished as either "right-handed" or "left-handed" by their absolute configuration or some other criterion. The two enantiomers have the same chemical properties, except when reacting with other chiral compounds. They also have the same physical properties, except that they often have opposite optical activities. A homogeneous mixture of the two enantiomers in equal parts is said to be racemic, and it usually differs chemically and physically from the pure enantiomers.

Chiral molecules will usually have a stereogenic element from which chirality arises. The most common type of stereogenic element is a stereogenic center, or stereocenter. In the case of organic compounds, stereocenters most frequently take the form of a carbon atom with four distinct groups attached to it in a tetrahedral geometry. A given stereocenter has two possible configurations, which give rise to stereoisomers (diastereomers and enantiomers) in molecules with one or more stereocenter. For a chiral molecule with one or more stereocenter, the enantiomer corresponds to the stereoisomer in which every stereocenter has the opposite configuration. An organic compound with only one stereogenic carbon is always chiral. On the other hand, an organic compound with multiple stereogenic carbons is typically, but not always, chiral. In particular, if the stereocenters are configured in such a way that the molecule has an internal plane of symmetry, then the molecule is achiral and is known as a meso compound. Less commonly, other atoms like N, P, S, and Si can also serve as stereocenters, provided they have four distinct substituents (including lone pair electrons) attached to them.

Molecules with chirality arising from one or more stereocenters are classified as possessing central chirality. There are two other types of stereogenic elements that can give rise to chirality, a stereogenic axis (axial chirality) and a stereogenic plane (planar chirality). Finally, the inherent curvature of a molecule can also give rise to chirality (inherent chirality). These types of chirality are far less common than central chirality. BINOL is a typical example of an axially chiral molecule, while trans-cyclooctene is a commonly cited example of a planar chiral molecule. Finally, helicene possesses helical chirality, which is one type of inherent chirality.

Chirality is an important concept for stereochemistry and biochemistry. Most substances relevant to biology are chiral, such as carbohydrates (sugars, starch, and cellulose), the amino acids that are the building blocks of proteins, and the nucleic acids. In living organisms, one typically finds only one of the two enantiomers of a chiral compound. For that reason, organisms that consume a chiral compound usually can metabolize only one of its enantiomers. For the same reason, the two enantiomers of a chiral pharmaceutical usually have vastly different potencies or effects.

Definition 
The chirality of a molecule is based on the molecular symmetry of its conformations. A conformation of a molecule is chiral if and only if it belongs to the Cn, Dn, T, O, I point groups (the chiral point groups). However, whether the molecule itself is considered to be chiral depends on whether its chiral conformations are persistent isomers that could be isolated as separated enantiomers, at least in principle, or the enantiomeric conformers rapidly interconvert at a given temperature and timescale through low-energy conformational changes (rendering the molecule achiral). For example, despite having chiral gauche conformers that belong to the C2 point group, butane is considered achiral at room temperature because rotation about the central C–C bond rapidly interconverts the enantiomers (3.4 kcal/mol barrier). Similarly, cis-1,2-dichlorocyclohexane consists of chair conformers that are nonidentical mirror images, but the two can interconvert via the cyclohexane chair flip (~10 kcal/mol barrier). As another example, amines with three distinct substituents (R1R2R3N:) are also regarded as achiral molecules because their enantiomeric pyramidal conformers rapidly invert and interconvert through a planar transition state (~6 kcal/mol barrier). 

However, if the temperature in question is low enough, the process that interconverts the enantiomeric chiral conformations becomes slow compared to a given timescale.  The molecule would then be considered to be chiral at that temperature. The relevant timescale is, to some degree, arbitrarily defined: 1000 seconds is sometimes employed, as this is regarded as the lower limit for the amount of time required for chemical or chromatographic separation of enantiomers in a practical sense.  Molecules that are chiral at room temperature due to restricted rotation about a single bond (barrier to rotation ≥ ca. 23 kcal/mol) are said to exhibit atropisomerism.

A chiral compound can contain no improper axis of rotation (Sn), which includes planes of symmetry and inversion center. Chiral molecules are always dissymmetric (lacking Sn) but not always asymmetric (lacking all symmetry elements except the trivial identity). Asymmetric molecules are always chiral.

The following table shows some examples of chiral and achiral molecules, with the Schoenflies notation of the point group of the molecule. In the achiral molecules, X and Y (with no subscript) represent achiral groups, whereas X and X or Y and Y represent enantiomers. Note that there is no meaning to the orientation of an S axis, which is just an inversion. Any orientation will do, so long as it passes through the center of inversion. Also note that higher symmetries of chiral and achiral molecules also exist, and symmetries that do not include those in the table, such as the chiral C or the achiral S.

Stereogenic centers

A stereogenic center (or stereocenter) is an atom such that swapping the positions of two ligands (connected groups) on that atom results in a molecule that is stereoisomeric to the original.  For example, a common case is a tetrahedral carbon bonded to four distinct groups a, b, c, and d (Cabcd), where swapping any two groups (e.g., Cbacd) leads to a stereoisomer of the original, so the central C is a stereocenter.  Many chiral molecules have point chirality, namely a single chiral stereogenic center that coincides with an atom. This stereogenic center usually has four or more bonds to different groups, and may be carbon (as in many biological molecules), phosphorus (as in many organophosphates), silicon, or a metal (as in many chiral coordination compounds). However, a stereogenic center can also be a trivalent atom whose bonds are not in the same plane, such as phosphorus in P-chiral phosphines (PRR′R″) and sulfur in S-chiral sulfoxides (OSRR′), because a lone-pair of electrons is present instead of a fourth bond.

Similarly, a stereogenic axis (or plane) is defined as an axis (or plane) in the molecule such that the swapping of any two ligands attached to the axis (or plane) gives rise to a stereoisomer.  For instance, the C2-symmetric species 1,1′-bi-2-naphthol (BINOL) and 1,3-dichloroallene have stereogenic axes and exhibit axial chirality, while (E)-cyclooctene and many ferrocene derivatives bearing two or more substituents have stereogenic planes and exhibit planar chirality.

Chirality can also arise from isotopic differences between atoms, such as in the deuterated benzyl alcohol PhCHDOH; which is chiral and optically active ([α]D = 0.715°), even though the non-deuterated compound PhCH2OH is not.

If two enantiomers easily interconvert, the pure enantiomers may be practically impossible to separate, and only the racemic mixture is observable. This is the case, for example, of most amines with three different substituents (NRR′R″), because of the low energy barrier for nitrogen inversion.

It is not necessary for the chiral substance to have a stereogenic element. Examples include certain helicenes, calixarenes and fullerenes, which have inherent chirality.  Moreover, it is possible for a molecule to have a center of chirality that sits in a position that does not correspond to an atomic center (and thus, a stereocenter).  This occurs in the case of 1,3,5(7)-substituted admantanes (e.g., (1S,3R,5R,7S)-3-methyl-5-phenyladamantane-1-carboxylic acid shown in the side box). 

When the optical rotation for an enantiomer is too low for practical measurement, the species is said to exhibit cryptochirality. 

Chirality is an intrinsic part of the identity of a molecule, so the systematic name includes details of the absolute configuration (R/S, D/L, or other designations).

Manifestations of chirality
 Flavor: the artificial sweetener aspartame has two enantiomers. L-aspartame tastes sweet whereas D-aspartame is tasteless.
 Odor: R-(–)-carvone smells like spearmint whereas S-(+)-carvone smells like caraway.
 Drug effectiveness: the antidepressant drug Citalopram is sold as a racemic mixture. However, studies have shown that only the (S)-(+) enantiomer is responsible for the drug's beneficial effects. 
 Drug safety: D‑penicillamine is used in chelation therapy and for the treatment of rheumatoid arthritis whereas L‑penicillamine is toxic as it inhibits the action of pyridoxine, an essential B vitamin.

In biochemistry
Many biologically active molecules are chiral, including the naturally occurring amino acids (the building blocks of proteins) and sugars. 

The origin of this homochirality in biology is the subject of much debate. Most scientists believe that Earth life's "choice" of chirality was purely random, and that if carbon-based life forms exist elsewhere in the universe, their chemistry could theoretically have opposite chirality. However, there is some suggestion that early amino acids could have formed in comet dust. In this case, circularly polarised radiation (which makes up 17% of stellar radiation) could have caused the selective destruction of one chirality of amino acids, leading to a selection bias which ultimately resulted in all life on Earth being homochiral.

Enzymes, which are chiral, often distinguish between the two enantiomers of a chiral substrate. One could imagine an enzyme as having a glove-like cavity that binds a substrate. If this glove is right-handed, then one enantiomer will fit inside and be bound, whereas the other enantiomer will have a poor fit and is unlikely to bind.

-forms of amino acids tend to be tasteless, whereas -forms tend to taste sweet. Spearmint leaves contain the -enantiomer of the chemical carvone or R-(−)-carvone and caraway seeds contain the -enantiomer or S-(+)-carvone. The two smell different to most people because our olfactory receptors are chiral.

Chirality is important in context of ordered phases as well, for example the addition of a small amount of an optically active molecule to a nematic phase (a phase that has long range orientational order of molecules) transforms that phase to a chiral nematic phase (or cholesteric phase). Chirality in context of such phases in polymeric fluids has also been studied in this context.

In inorganic chemistry 

Chirality is a symmetry property, not a property of any part of the periodic table. Thus many inorganic materials, molecules, and ions are chiral. Quartz is an example from the mineral kingdom. Such noncentric materials are of interest for applications in nonlinear optics.

In the areas of coordination chemistry and organometallic chemistry, chirality is pervasive and of practical importance. A famous example is tris(bipyridine)ruthenium(II) complex in which the three bipyridine ligands adopt a chiral propeller-like arrangement. The two enantiomers of complexes such as [Ru(2,2′-bipyridine)3]2+ may be designated as Λ (capital lambda, the Greek version of "L") for a left-handed twist of the propeller described by the ligands, and Δ (capital delta, Greek "D") for a right-handed twist (pictured). Also cf.  dextro- and levo- (laevo-).

Chiral ligands confer chirality to a metal complex, as illustrated by metal-amino acid complexes. If the metal exhibits catalytic properties, its combination with a chiral ligand is the basis of asymmetric catalysis.

Methods and practices

The term optical activity is derived from the interaction of chiral materials with polarized light. In a solution, the (−)-form, or levorotatory form, of an optical isomer rotates the plane of a beam of linearly polarized light counterclockwise. The (+)-form, or dextrorotatory form, of an optical isomer does the opposite. The rotation of light is measured using a polarimeter and is expressed as the optical rotation.

Enantiomers can be separated by chiral resolution. This often involves forming crystals of a salt composed of one of the enantiomers and an acid or base from the so-called chiral pool of naturally occurring chiral compounds, such as malic acid or the amine brucine. Some racemic mixtures spontaneously crystallize into right-handed and left-handed crystals that can be separated by hand. Louis Pasteur used this method to separate left-handed and right-handed sodium ammonium tartrate crystals in 1849. Sometimes it is possible to seed a racemic solution with a right-handed and a left-handed crystal so that each will grow into a large crystal.

Liquid chromatography (HPLC and TLC) may also used as an analytical method for the direct separation of enantiomers and the control of enantiomeric purity, e.g. active  pharmaceutical ingredients (APIs) which are chiral.

Miscellaneous nomenclature
 Any non-racemic chiral substance is called scalemic. Scalemic materials can be enantiopure or enantioenriched.
 A chiral substance is enantiopure when only one of two possible enantiomers is present so that all molecules within a sample have the same chirality sense. Use of homochiral as a synonym is strongly discouraged. 
 A chiral substance is enantioenriched or heterochiral when its enantiomeric ratio is greater than 50:50 but less than 100:0. 
 Enantiomeric excess or e.e. is the difference between how much of one enantiomer is present compared to the other. For example, a sample with 40% e.e. of R contains 70% R and 30% S (70% − 30% = 40%).

History 
The rotation of plane polarized light by chiral substances was first observed by Jean-Baptiste Biot in 1812, and gained considerable importance in the sugar industry, analytical chemistry, and pharmaceuticals. Louis Pasteur deduced in 1848 that this phenomenon has a molecular basis. The term chirality itself was coined by Lord Kelvin in 1894. Different enantiomers or diastereomers of a compound were formerly called optical isomers due to their different optical properties. At one time, chirality was thought to be restricted to organic chemistry, but this misconception was overthrown by the resolution of a purely inorganic compound, a cobalt complex called hexol, by Alfred Werner in 1911.

In the early 1970s, various groups established that the human olfactory organ is capable of distinguishing chiral compounds.

See also 

 Chirality (electromagnetism)
 Chirality (mathematics)
 Chirality (physics)
 Enantiopure drug
 Enantioselective synthesis
 Handedness
 Orientation (vector space)
 Pfeiffer effect
 Stereochemistry for overview of stereochemistry in general
 Stereoisomerism
 Supramolecular chirality

References

Further reading

External links

 21st International Symposium on Chirality
 STEREOISOMERISM - OPTICAL ISOMERISM
 Symposium highlights-Session 5: New technologies for small molecule synthesis
 IUPAC nomenclature for amino acid configurations.
 Michigan State University's explanation of R/S nomenclature
Chirality & Odour Perception at leffingwell.com
Chirality & Bioactivity I.: Pharmacology
 Chirality and the Search for Extraterrestrial Life
 The Handedness of the Universe by Roger A Hegstrom and Dilip K Kondepudi http://quantummechanics.ucsd.edu/ph87/ScientificAmerican/Sciam/Hegstrom_The_Handedness_of_the_universe.pdf

Stereochemistry
Polarization (waves)
Chirality
Chemical nomenclature
Biochemistry
Origin of life
Pharmacology